Watson Peninsula is a narrow peninsula  long separating Macdougal and Marr Bays on the north coast of Laurie Island, in the South Orkney Islands of Antarctica. It was charted in 1903 by the Scottish National Antarctic Expedition under Bruce, who named it for G.L. Watson, yacht designer and redesigner of the expedition ship Scotia.

Important Bird Area
The peninsula has been identified an Important Bird Area (IBA) by BirdLife International because it supports a large breeding colony of about 13,000 pairs of chinstrap penguins.  Other birds nesting at the site include Adélie and gentoo penguins as well as southern giant petrels.

References

Laurie Island
Peninsulas of the South Orkney Islands
Important Bird Areas of Antarctica
Seabird colonies
Penguin colonies